ISO 3166-2:FR is the entry for France in ISO 3166-2, part of the ISO 3166 standard published by the International Organization for Standardization (ISO), which defines codes for the names of the principal subdivisions (e.g., provinces or states) of all countries coded in ISO 3166-1.

Currently for France, ISO 3166-2 codes are defined for the following subdivisions:
 Metropolitan France (3 levels):
 12 metropolitan regions
 3 metropolitan collectivities with special status
 95 metropolitan departments
 1 European collectivity
 Overseas France:
 1 dependency
 5 overseas collectivities
 1 overseas collectivity with special status
 3 overseas departmental collectivities
 1 overseas territory
 2 overseas unique territorial collectivities

Each code consists of two parts, separated by a hyphen. The second part is either of the following:
 one digit followed by two letters: European collectivity
 two digits: metropolitan departments
 two digits followed by a letter: metropolitan collectivities with special status
 two letters: overseas collectivities, overseas collectivity with special status, overseas territory (matching their ISO 3166-1 alpha-2 codes)
 three letters: metropolitan regions
 three digits: overseas departmental collectivities, overseas unique territorial collectivities

The metropolitan departments use their INSEE codes, which are currently used in postal codes, and used in vehicle registration plates until 2009. INSEE codes are assigned as follows:
 01–89 except 20: departments created before the 20th century, assigned in alphabetical order (prefixes in the form of "Bas-" and "Haute-" are ignored at the primary sort level), except Paris and Yvelines, which replaced the former departments Seine and Seine-et-Oise respectively after the reorganization of the Paris region in 1968;
 90: Territoire de Belfort, which was given department status in 1922;
 91–95: departments created after the reorganization of the Paris region in 1968;
 2A and 2B: Corse-du-Sud and Haute-Corse, which were created after the division of Corsica in 1975, whose INSEE code was 20.

Current codes
Subdivision names are listed as in the ISO 3166-2 standard published by the ISO 3166 Maintenance Agency (ISO 3166/MA).

Click on the button in the header to sort each column.

First-level metropolitan subdivisions

Second-level subdivisions

Third-level subdivisions

Dependency, overseas territory, and overseas collectivities

Subdivisions included in ISO 3166-1
Besides being included as subdivisions of France in ISO 3166-2, several subdivisions are also officially assigned their own country codes in ISO 3166-1.

The dependency Clipperton Island is also exceptionally reserved the ISO 3166-1 alpha-2 code  on the request of the International Telecommunication Union.

Metropolitan France (the part of France located in Europe) was previously officially assigned its own set of country codes in ISO 3166-1, with alpha-2 code , before it was deleted from ISO 3166-1. The code is now exceptionally reserved on the request of France.

Changes
The following changes to the entry have been announced by the ISO 3166/MA since the first publication of ISO  in 1998. ISO stopped issuing newsletters in 2013.

Former metropolitan regions (before 31 December 2015) 

 Notes

See also
 Subdivisions of France
 FIPS region codes of France
 NUTS codes of France

Explanatory notes

External links
 ISO Online Browsing Platform: FR
 Departments of France, Statoids.com

2:FR
ISO 3166-2
ISO 3166-2
France geography-related lists